Charlotte Speedway was a wooden board track in Pineville, North Carolina, near Charlotte.  It operated from 1924 to 1927, hosting AAA national championship trail races.

History
Financed by local businessmen, the speedway cost $380,000. Nearly 30,000 spectators attended the inaugural event in October 1924, which was won by Tommy Milton.

The May 1925 event drew 55,000 people, but attendance figures had dwindled to 7,500 by November 1926 when the AAA national championship trail visited the track for the third time that season.  The final races were held in September 1927.  Today, the Southland Industrial Park is situated at the former site of the racing plant, which Charlotte Motor Speedway has replaced as the area's predominant racing venue.

References

Defunct speedway venues in the United States
Motorsport venues in North Carolina
Sports venues in Mecklenburg County, North Carolina